Belemnitella bulbosa is a species of belemnite from the Late Cretaceous of North America. It is known only from two localities - the Pierre Shale and Fox Hills Formations. B. bulbosa had a slender somewhat cylindrical rostrum (guard) with a slightly expanded front opening. Like other members of the genus Belemnitella, it had a dorsal ridge on the rostrum. The phragmocone is about the same size or slightly longer than the rostrum and has an oval cross-section.

References

Belemnites